East Island is an island in Milne Bay Province of southeastern Papua New Guinea.

It is in the Bonvouloir Islands archipelago group of the Louisiade Archipelago.

References

Islands of Milne Bay Province
Louisiade Archipelago